"Comme moi" (English: "Like Me") is a song by French-Guinean rapper and songwriter Black M featuring Colombian singer-songwriter Shakira. It was released on March 31, 2017 as the fifth official single from Éternel insatisfait and was also included in Shakira's album El Dorado. Included on the latter album is also an English version of the song titled "What We Said" by Shakira featuring Magic!.

Music video
The music video for the song was released on March 31, 2017 and features Shakira in a blonde wig and Black M in a black tang top. It had a purple set and a black and white set.

English version
The English version of the track, titled "What We Said", was released on May 26, 2017 on Shakira’s eleventh studio album El Dorado. It features Canadian reggae fusion band Magic!. This is the second collaboration between the two as the band was featured on Shakira’s 2014 self titled tenth studio album on a track called "Cut Me Deep".

Charts

References

2017 songs
2017 singles
Black M songs
Shakira songs
Songs written by Shakira
Songs written by Nasri (musician)